Pithecheir is a genus of rodent in the family Muridae endemic to Southeast Asia.
It contains the following species:
 Red tree rat (Pithecheir melanurus)
 Malayan tree rat (Pithecheir parvus)

References

 
Rodent genera
Taxa named by René Lesson
Taxonomy articles created by Polbot